Edward Henry Davey (January 19, 1854 – March 10, 1911) was an architect and politician born in St. John’s, Newfoundland. He is best known, along with his brother George, as a builder of the city of St. John's after the great fire of 1892.

Davey was educated at the Central School in St. John’s and underwent an apprenticeship with his father, also a carpenter, forming a partnership between father and son. Upon the death of his father, he went into business with his brother George and to form E.H. and G. Davey, Contractors, Builders and Ships Joiners. The company’s offices were located at 111 Bond Street with wharf and stores situated on the St. John’s waterfront.

In the aftermath of the great fire of 1892, there was great demand for architects, contractors and builders. The Davey brothers were at the forefront of this massive effort and were responsible for many of the new buildings that were erected in the months following the fire such as the Church of England Orphanage, the British Hall and the restoration of the Church of England Cathedral of St. John the Baptist.

By 1900, the company was very successful and Davey decided to enter politics. In the November 8, 1900, both Davey and his running mate, Henry Gear, won the dual district of Burin for the Liberal Party, led by Robert Bond. Davey spent 11 years as MHA for Burin. He was re-elected in the general election of 1904. Davey and Gear were returned to the House of Assembly in the famous tie-election of 1908. He was re-elected in the 1909 election.

Davey was involved in many facets of the Church of England, serving on the Diocesan Synod for Newfoundland, as a member of the Vestry at the Cathedral and as a member of the Cathedral Restoration Committee. He was a long-time member of St. John’s Lodge No. 5 of the Society of United Fishermen, a philanthropic and fraternal organization founded in Heart’s Content in 1871. Davey was also a very good cricket player and was elected president of the Avalon Cricket Club in 1891. He was also quite prominent in the Freemasons.

See also
 List of people of Newfoundland and Labrador
 List of communities in Newfoundland and Labrador

References
 Encyclopedia of Newfoundland and Labrador
 Center for Newfoundland Studies (CNS)

1854 births
1911 deaths
Liberal Party of Newfoundland and Labrador MHAs
Politicians from St. John's, Newfoundland and Labrador